This is a list of mayors of Bedum. Bedum is a town in the north of the Netherlands.

References

Het Hogeland
Bedum